Isidore de Souza (4 April 1934 – 13 March 1999) was a Beninese priest who was Archbishop of Cotonou from 1990 to 1999.

He was born into the aristocratic De Souza family of Ouidah on 4 April 1934. He was the uncle of Chantal Yayi, who served as First Lady of Benin from 2006 to 2016, and the late Marcel Alain de Souza (1953–2019), a banker and former President of the ECOWAS Commission.

De Souza went on to study in Abidjan and Rome. He was ordained a priest on 8 July 1962. De Souza was appointed as Coadjutor Archbishop of Cotonou on 17 July 1981 and became Archbishop on 27 December 1990. He led the National Conference in February 1990, which was convened to address economic issues but returned Benin to democracy. He was instrumental in preventing the army from disbanding it. De Souza served as the chairman of the High Council of the Republic from 28 February 1990 to 31 March 1991, setting up the presidential election and a new constitution. He persuaded President Mathieu Kerekou to accept the decisions of the council and return Benin to civilian rule. De Souza was the chairman of the Regional Episcopal Conference of Francophone West Africa from 1997 to his death. He died on 13 March 1999 in Ouidah.

Notes

References

1934 births
1999 deaths
Beninese Roman Catholic archbishops
People from Ouidah
20th-century Roman Catholic archbishops in Africa
Presidents of the National Assembly (Benin)
Roman Catholic archbishops of Cotonou